Erlenbach bei Dahn is a municipality in Südwestpfalz district, in Rhineland-Palatinate, western Germany.

Above the village is Berwartstein Castle on one side of the Erlenbach stream and the outwork Little France on the other.

References

Municipalities in Rhineland-Palatinate
Palatinate Forest
South Palatinate
Südwestpfalz